is a city located in Kumamoto Prefecture, Japan.

Geography 
Located at the geographic center of Kyushu, Yatsushiro City is situated on the aptly named Yatsushiro Sea in between Kumamoto and Ashikita City.

Climate
Yatsushiro has a humid subtropical climate (Köppen climate classification Cfa) with hot, humid summers and cool winters. There is significant precipitation throughout the year, especially during June and July.

Demographics
Per Japanese census data, the population of Yatsushiro in 2020 is 123,067 people. Yatsushiro has been conducting censuses since 1920.

History 
On August 1, 2005, Yatsushiro absorbed the towns of Kagami and Senchō, and the villages of Izumi, Sakamoto and Tōyō (all from Yatsushiro District) to create the new and expanded city of Yatsushiro.

Yatsushiro ware traditionally comes from there.

Population 
As of March 31, 2017, the city has an estimated population of 129,358 and a population density of 190 persons per km2. The total area is 680.59 km2. It is the second largest city in the prefecture after Kumamoto City.

Economy 
Yatsushiro is known locally for several products and dishes. The banpeiyu fruit bears a resemblance to hugely oversized grapefruits. Karashi Renkon is a specialty which is a lotus root stuffed with a mustard-like sauce called karashi and coated with egg. Basashi is raw horse meat and is considered a delicacy within Japan. It is often served with onion and ginger. Basashi burgers can be found at hamburger restaurants.

The city's landmarks include the ruins of Yatsushiro Castle (now part of a shinto shrine) and the often overlooked port area that offers magnificent views of the nearby  Amakusa islands, Yatsuhiro Sea, and the local paper factory.

A flight of 777 stairs into the nearby mountains is located at one end of the town and is a popular attraction. The lookout point provides a panoramic view of the town and the coastal areas.

Sights include Yatsushiro Gu, Yatsushiro Shrine, Mizushima Shrine, Gokanosho Suspension Bridges, and the Hinagu Onsen.

The main shopping area, the honmachi, is a covered arcade that runs for several city blocks. However, since the opening of two large malls nearby the area has been in decline.

Transportation
It has several train lines that run through it as well as a Shinkansen line. In addition, the Kyushu Expressway and Minamikyushu Expressway converges here. The Yatsushiro District is known for connecting the east part of Kumamoto Prefecture with the west part which connects to Miyazaki Prefecture.

Trains
 JR Kyushu lines
 Kyushu Shinkansen; Shin-Yatsushiro Station
 Kagoshima Line; Arisa Station, Senchō Station, Shin-Yatsushiro Station, Yatsushiro Station
 Trans-Kyushu Limited Express, Yatsushiro Station
Hisatsu Line, Yatsushiro Station, Dan Station, Sakamoto Station
 Hisatsu Orange Railway line
 Hisatsu Orange Railway Line; Shin-Yatsushiro, Yatsushiro, Higo-Kōda, Hinagu Onsen, Higo-Futami

Notable places
 Yatsushiro Castle - A castle ruin, one of the Continued Top 100 Japanese Castles.

Festivals 
 Myokensai Festival: Yatsushiro is known for its Myokensai festival on November 23 of each year, which includes a parade of horses through the streets of the city.  Also, each fall Yatsushiro hosts one of Japan's largest fireworks displays.
Yatsushiro Fireworks Festival: Usually hosted in late fall, this is one of the largest if not the largest fireworks festival in Kyushu. Firework companies enter into this festival to showcase their designs!
Kumagawa Festival: Held in early August, this festival celebrates the Kumagawa River which flows through the city. During the festival, various schools, companies, and groups will dance through the streets to music. Some of the festival goers even come in costume! Food stalls and festival food are also available.
Kyushu International Three Day March: Held in mid-May, foreigners and locals join together in planned walks around the city and its surrounding areas. Various routes are available such as  5, 10, 20, 30, and 40 km courses. Food and beverages can also be purchased at the festival and there is local entertainment at the center stage. There is an English speaking staff on hand for those who need English assistance.

Sports
Yatsushiro hosted group matches at the 2019 World Women's Handball Championship.

Famous people
Jun Kunimura, actor
Aki Yashiro, singer
Eri Ishida, actress
Haruto Kō, poet and novelist
Junichi Kashiwabara, baseball player
Kazumi Sonokawa, baseball player
Kimiko Jinnai, badminton player
Kosuke Noda, baseball player
Matsui Okinaga, samurai
Matsuki Miyazaki, doctor
Nishiyama Sōin, haikai-no-renga poet
Nobuhiko Matsunaka, baseball player
Shoko Asahara, founder of Aum Shinrikyo
Eiji Ezaki, retired professional wrestler best known as Hayabusa
Yuki Fukushima, badminton player

References

External links

 Yatsushiro City official website 

 
Cities in Kumamoto Prefecture
Port settlements in Japan
Populated coastal places in Japan